James Farrington (October 1, 1791 – October 29, 1859) was an American physician, banker and politician from New Hampshire. He served as a member of the United States House of Representatives, the New Hampshire Senate and the New Hampshire House of Representatives in the early 1800s.

Early life
Born in Conway, New Hampshire, Farrington was the son of Jeremiah and Molly (Swan) Farrington. He attended the common schools in Conway and graduated from Fryeburg Academy in 1814. He studied medicine and then began to practice medicine in Rochester, New Hampshire in 1818. He was a member of the New Hampshire Medical Society.

In 1834, Farrington and Nehemiah Eastman organized the Rochester Bank. Farrington served as president of the bank until his death.

Political career
Farrington served as a member of the New Hampshire House of Representatives from 1828 to 1831, and as a member of the New Hampshire Senate in 1836. Elected as a Democrat to the Twenty-fifth Congress, he served as a United States Representative for New Hampshire from March 4, 1837, to March 3, 1839.

After leaving Congress, Farrington was appointed one of the trustees of the New Hampshire Insane Asylum in 1845. He resumed the practice of medicine after 1845.

Death
Farrington died in Rochester, Strafford County, New Hampshire on October 29, 1859. He is interred at Old Cemetery in Rochester.

Personal life
He married Mary D. Hansen, daughter of Joseph and Charity Dame Hansen, on March 8, 1827. They had four children: James Bonaparte, Mary, Joseph, and Walter.

References

External links
 Biographical Directory of the United States Congress
 
 James Farrington

1791 births
1859 deaths
People from Conway, New Hampshire
People from Rochester, New Hampshire
Democratic Party members of the New Hampshire House of Representatives
Democratic Party New Hampshire state senators
Democratic Party members of the United States House of Representatives from New Hampshire
19th-century American politicians
Fryeburg Academy alumni